Pilchowice may refer to the following places in Poland:
Pilchowice, Lower Silesian Voivodeship (south-west Poland)
Pilchowice, Silesian Voivodeship (south Poland)